Beetsha is a village in North-West District of Botswana. It is located north of the Okavango River and close to Okavango Delta. The population was 760 in 2001 census.

References

North-West District (Botswana)
Villages in Botswana